Flinders View is a suburb of Ipswich in the City of Ipswich, Queensland, Australia. In the  Flinders View had a population of 5,808 people.

Geography 
Flinders View is bisected by the Cunningham Highway which also forms part of the northern and southern boundary of the suburb.

Flinders View consists of four estates, Fairview Rise, Kensington Hills, Jacana Place and Flinders Crest. Major parks include Fairview Park and Nugent Park and its local shopping centre is Winston Glades, which has seen much change and development recently with the enlargement of Supa IGA and the movement of Pizza Hut and Network Video to a new section of the centre.

History 
The origin of the suburb name is from the view and proximity to Flinders Peak from the suburb of Flinders View.

In the  Flinders View had a population of 5,808 people.

Education 
There are no schools in Flinders View. The nearest government schools are Raceview State School in neighbouring Raceview to the north and Amberley District State School in neighbouring Yamanto to the west. The nearest government secondary school is Bremer State High School in the Ipswich CBD to the north-west.

Amenities 
The Ipswich City Council operates a fortnightly mobile library service which visits the Winston Glades shopping centre.

References

External links

 

Suburbs of Ipswich, Queensland